Pantanodon madagascariensis is an extinct species of fish in the family Poeciliidae. It was endemic to eastern Madagascar. Its natural habitats were rivers and swamps. It became extinct due to habitat loss and competition from introduced species of Gambusia.

Sources

Madagascariensis
Fish extinctions since 1500
Extinct animals of Madagascar
Fish described in 1963
Taxonomy articles created by Polbot
Species made extinct by human activities